Paulo Comelli may refer to:

 Paulo Comelli (philatelist) (1943–2011), Brazilian philatelist
 Paulo Comelli (footballer) (born 1960), Brazilian football manager and former footballer